The Bekily District is a district in the Androy Region, located in southeastern Madagascar.

Communes
The district is further divided into 18 communes:

 Ambahita
 Ambatosola
 Anivorano Mitsinjo
 Anja Nord
 Ankaranabo Nord
 Antsakoamaro
 Bekitro
 Belindo Mahasoa
 Beraketa
 Beteza
 Bevitiky
 Manakompy
 Maroviro
 Morafeno Bekily
 Tanambao Tsirandrana
 Tanandava
 Tsikolaky
 Vohimanga

References

Districts of Androy